The Serbs in Turkey are Turkish citizens of Serbian descent or Serbia-born people who reside in Turkey.

History
During the age of the Ottoman Empire most of Serbia and the Balkans were under Turkish control, and many Serbs moved to Istanbul and Anatolia for reasons ranging from economic to forceful relocation. On 28 August 1521, the Belgrade Fortress was captured by Suleiman the Magnificent, using 250,000 Turkish soldiers and over 100 ships. Subsequently, most of the city was razed to the ground and its entire Orthodox Christian population was deported to Istanbul to an area that has since become known as the Belgrade forest.

Many Janissaries were of Serbian descent and were taken as children from their homes and educated in Turkey. Some Serbs achieved political prominence and several Grand Viziers were born as Serbs.

Notable people

 Mahmud Pasha Angelović,  Ottoman Grand Vizier from 1456 to 1466, and 1472 to 1474
 Gedik Ahmed Pasha,  Ottoman Grand Vizier from 1474 to 1477
 Deli Husrev Pasha, Ottoman statesman and second vizier
 Hadım Ali Pasha, Ottoman Grand Vizier from 1501 to 1503 and 1506 to 1511
 Lala Mustafa Pasha,  Ottoman Grand Vizier in 1580
 Semiz Ali Pasha, Ottoman Grand Vizier from 1561 to 1565
 Sokollu Mehmed Pasha, Ottoman Grand Vizier from 1565 to 1579
 Sokolluzade Lala Mehmed Pasha, Ottoman Grand Vizier from 1604 to 1606
 Boşnak Derviş Mehmed Pasha, Ottoman Grand Vizier during 1606
 Nevesinli Salih Pasha, Ottoman Grand Vizier from 1645 to 1647
 Kara Musa Pasha, Ottoman Grand Vizier during 1647
 Sarı Süleyman Pasha, Ottoman Grand Vizier from 1685 to 1687
 Daltaban Mustafa Pasha, Ottoman Grand Vizier from 1702 to 1703
 Damat Melek Mehmed Pasha, Ottoman Grand Vizier from 1792 to 1794
 Ivaz Mehmed Pasha, Ottoman Grand Vizier from 1739 to 1740
 Yavuz Ali Pasha, Ottoman Governor of Egypt from 1601 to 1603
 Meylişah Hatun, Consort to Sultan Osman II
 George Berovich, Governor-General  of Crete and Prince of Samos.
 Omar Pasha (1806–1871), general, convert
 Mara Branković, wife of Murad II, very influential in imperial affairs, ambassador to Venice
 Osman Aga of Temesvar (1670–1725), Ottoman commander
 Şehsuvar Sultan
 Aşub Sultan
 Skenderbeg Crnojević
 George Berovich
 Aganlija
 Kučuk-Alija
 Sali Aga
 Sinan-paša Sijerčić, Ottoman Bosnian general. Bosnian Serb origin.
 Malkoçoğlu family, one of four leading akinci families. Serbian origin.
 Ivana Sert, Serbian-Turkish television personality, socialite, presenter, model
 Celal Şengör, Turkish geologist. His paternal grandmother was a Serb.

See also

 Serbia-Turkey relations
 Turks in Serbia
 Gallipoli Serbs
 Belgrad Forest
 Asia Minor Slavs

References

Turkey
European diaspora in Turkey
 
Turkey
Turkey